Blackmail is a 1939 American crime drama film directed by H. C. Potter and starring Edward G. Robinson, Ruth Hussey and Gene Lockhart.

Plot
John Ingram is a highly successful oil-field firefighter and a family man. It is a contented life, he has even bought his own oil well in hope of striking it rich. His greatest fears are realized, however, when a man, William Ramey, from his secret past sees Ingram in a newsreel and shows up looking for a job.

Ramey attempts to blackmail Ingram, who had run from a chain gang years ago, and began a new life under an assumed name. After a shady deal is made, Ingram is tricked and Ramey turns him into authorities, who return him to a chain gang. Ramey subsequently becomes a very rich man.

When Ingram finds out about the success of the man who betrayed him, he plans a daring escape in an attempt to return home and get revenge.

Ramey has successfully run Ingram's business in his absence;but only because no emergencies have arisen that would require
Ingram's special knowledge.

As fate would have it, the escaped Ingram arrives at the plant just as a major oil fire breaks out.

Overpowering Ramey, Ingram slowly drags him towards the heart of the blaze; hinting that unless Ramey makes a full confession;
he will do nothing to save them.

A frightened Ramey agrees. Ingram douses the oil fire, and is eventually restored to his former position of respectability.

Cast
 Edward G. Robinson as John R. Ingram, an alias of John Harrington
 Ruth Hussey as Helen Ingram
 Gene Lockhart as William Ramey
 Bobs Watson as Hank Ingram
 Guinn 'Big Boy' Williams as Moose McCarthy (as Guinn Williams)
 John Wray as Diggs
 Arthur Hohl as Rawlins
 Esther Dale as Sarah
 Frank Darien as Watchman (uncredited) 
 Robert Homans as Cooper (uncredited) 
 Ethan Laidlaw as Oil Worker (uncredited) 
 Harry Tenbrook as Truck Driver (uncredited)

See also

 Cool Hand Luke is a 1967 American prison drama film 
 Hellfighters is a 1968 American action film starring John Wayne

References

External links
 
 
 
 

1939 films
1939 crime drama films
American black-and-white films
1930s English-language films
Films directed by H. C. Potter
Metro-Goldwyn-Mayer films
Films with screenplays by William Ludwig
Works about petroleum
American crime drama films
Films scored by Edward Ward (composer)
1930s American films
Films set in Oklahoma